Allisen Corpuz (born March 20, 1998) is an American professional golfer and member of the LPGA Tour. She was runner-up at the 2022 ISPS Handa World Invitational.

Early life, college and amateur career
Corpuz is a Hawaii native and attended the Punahou School in Honolulu, the same high school that produced Michelle Wie and Barack Obama. A golf prodigy, she was a three-time AJGA All-American. In 2008, she surpassed Michelle Wie as the youngest qualifier in U.S. Women's Amateur Public Links history at 10 years, 3 months and 9 days, and was featured in The New York Times under the headline "Golf's Next Wave".

Corpuz won the 2014 Hawaii State Open, represented Hawaii in the 2014 Asia Pacific Junior Cup and represented the West team at 2012 AJGA Wyndham Cup. Before college she had played in six USGA championships, the second most ever, and posted nine top-10 finishes in AJGA majors and over 15 top-5 AJGA results. As a high school senior in 2016 she was runner-up at the Canadian Women's Amateur Championship and won the Hawaii State Open on the fourth playoff hole. Corpuz also played as an amateur at the 2016 LPGA Lotte Championship at Ko Olina and carded a second-round 72, but missed the cut by three strokes.

Corpuz played college golf at the University of Southern California 2016–21 where she led the USC Trojans women's golf team with a 71.57 stroke average and was named a first-team All-American. She played in the 2020 and 2021 Arnold Palmer Cup and also represented the United States at the 2021 Curtis Cup.

The 2020 U.S. Women's Open was her third U.S. Open and her 16th USGA championship. Corpuz was the runner-up to Rachel Kuehn in the 2020 North and South Women's Amateur at Pinehurst, losing in 19 holes.

She rose to a career high of 7th in the World Amateur Golf Rankings.

Professional career
Corpuz turned professional in 2021 and finished T16 at Q-School to earn LPGA Tour membership for 2022. In her rookie season, she made 17 cuts in 21 events and finished 41st in the rankings. She recorded three top-10 finishes including a runner-up finish at the ISPS Handa World Invitational and a third-place finish at Pelican Women's Championship.

Amateur wins
2014 Hawaii Women's State Open
2016 Hawaii Women's State Open, Winn Grips Heather Farr Classic
2021 Lamkin San Diego Invitational, The Gold Rush

Source:

Results in LPGA majors
Results not in chronological order.

CUT = missed the half-way cut
NT = no tournament
T = tied

U.S. national team appearances
Amateur
Curtis Cup: 2021 (winners)
Arnold Palmer Cup: 2020, 2021 (winners)

Source:

References

External links

American female golfers
LPGA Tour golfers
USC Trojans women's golfers
Golfers from Hawaii
1998 births
Living people
21st-century American women